Queenie van de Zandt is an Australian actress, singer, comedian, recording artist, writer and arts educator.

Life and career
Born in Canberra to Dutch immigrants, van de Zandt attended St Matthew's Primary School and St Francis Xavier High School before graduating in the top 2% of her state at Daramalan College. She relocated to Sydney in 1992 and began her career performing in musicals and stage plays such as Hair, Cabaret, Les Misérables, Anything Goes, Threepenny Opera, Furious, Barmaids, After January, and The Boy from Oz.  She has since become one of Australia's leading ladies of the stage, working extensively in musical theatre, plays and cabaret, as well as appearing on television and in film and releasing several albums.

She also regularly performs, and has a cult following, as her comedy character and alter-ego, Jan van de Stool, a Dutch-born musical therapist.

Alongside her career as a performer, van de Zandt founded the Australian Musical Theatre Academy and runs workshops, masterclasses and courses throughout Australia and internationally in performance and audition technique for musical theatre, creating cabaret, the creative mindset and career development. She is widely regarded as Australia's leading teacher of audition technique for musical theatre. Alongside this she has held lecturing positions at the University of Ballarat Arts Academy, the Victorian College of the Arts and the National Institute of Dramatic Art (NIDA).

Awards
2018: Glug Award - The Lee Young Award for the Most Outstanding Cabaret Performance for Blue: The Songs of  Joni Mitchell

2017:  Broadway World - Sydney Award - Best Cabaret Performance for BLUE: The Songs of Joni Mitchell -

2017:  Broadway World - Sydney Award - Best Cabaret for BLUE: The Songs of Joni Mitchell

2008:  Glug Award – Jeffry Joynton-Smith Memorial Award for Best Supporting Actress for her performance as Izzy in Rabbit Hole

1997: MEAA ACT Green Room Award for Best Performance for her performance as Alison/Louise/Spokesperson in

Nominations 
2018  Helpmann Award for Best Cabaret Performer for her performance in BLUE: The Songs of Joni Mitchell

2018  Sydney Theatre Award for Best Cabaret Production for BLUE: The Songs of Joni Mitchell

2015  Green Room Award for Best Actress in a Leading Role for The Witch in Into the Woods

2015  Theatre People Pro-Choice Award for Best Actress in a Musical (limited run) for The Witch in Into the Woods

2010  Glug Award - Norman Kessell Award for Best Actress for her performance as Beverly in Abigail's Party

2009  Green Room Award for Best Supporting Performer in Theatre – Companies (joint nomination along with Jennifer Vuletic and Natalie Gamsu) for their performances as Women of Troy in Women of Troy

2008  Green Room Award for Best Cabaret Artiste for the International Melbourne Comedy Festival season of I GET THE MUSIC IN YOU an evening with Jan van de Stool

2007  AussieTheatre.com Award for Cabaret Show of the Year for Cabaret – in 12 Easy Steps

2007  AussieTheatre.com Award for Cabaret Artist of the Year for Cabaret – in 12 Easy Steps

2006  Sydney Theatre Award for Best Cabaret for her one-woman show I GET THE MUSIC IN YOU an evening with Jan van de Stool

2005  Green Room Award for Female Artist in a Supporting Role for her performance as Vicki Nichols in The Full Monty – The Musical

2004  Helpmann Award Nomination for Best Female Actor in a Supporting Role in a Musical for her performance as Mrs Sowerberry in Oliver!

References

Sources 

http://www.mooviees.com/322006-Queenie-van-de-Zandt/celebrity
http://www.australiantelevision.net/very_small_business/episodes.html
http://tagoo.ru/de/search.php?for=audio&search=tonight&page=9
http://webawork.com/content/index.php?option=com_content&task=view&id=18&Itemid=31

Australian television actresses
Academic staff of the Federation University Australia
Australian people of Dutch descent
Australian stage actresses
Actresses from Canberra